Doris Smith may refer to:

 Doris Ives Smith (1888–1951), British cookery book author writing under the name Catherine Ives 
Doris Buchanan Smith (1934–2002), American children's book author 
Doris E. Smith (1919–?), Irish writer of gothic and romance novels
Donna Douglas (1932–2015), née Doris Smith, American actress and comedienne
Toukie Smith (born 1955), née Doris Smith, American actress and model
Doris Smith-Ribner, née Doris Smith, American judge